Thevetia is a genus of flowering plants in the family Apocynaceae, first described for modern science as a genus in 1758. It is native to Mexico, Central America, South America, and Cuba. The taxonomy of the genus is controversial, with some authors including Cascabela within Thevetia, while others accept the two genera as separate.

Species
 Thevetia ahouai (L.) A.DC.  - Mexico, Central America, Cuba, Venezuela, Colombia
 Thevetia amazonica Ducke - Brazil, Bolivia
 Thevetia bicornuta Müll.Arg. - Brazil, Paraguay, NE Argentina

formerly included
 Thevetia alliodora = Cascabela ovata
 Thevetia cuneifolia = Cascabela ovata
 Thevetia gaumeri = Cascabela gaumeri 
 Thevetia humboldtii (Kunth) Voigt 1845 not R.H. Schomb. 1840 = Cascabela thevetioides
 Thevetia linearis = Cascabela thevetia 
 Thevetia neriifolia =  Cascabela thevetia 
 Thevetia ovata = Cascabela ovata
 Thevetia peruviana =  Cascabela thevetia 
 Thevetia pinifolia = Cascabela pinifolia 
 Thevetia plumeriifolia = Cascabela ovata
 Thevetia spathulata = Cascabela gaumeri 
 Thevetia steerei = Cascabela gaumeri 
 Thevetia thevetia =  Cascabela thevetia 
 Thevetia thevetioides = Cascabela thevetioides
 Thevetia yccotli = Cascabela thevetioides

References

External links

USDA Plants Profile

Apocynaceae genera
Rauvolfioideae